Ascó Nuclear Power Plant is a nuclear power station located in Ascó, Catalonia, in Spain.

It consists of two PWRs of 933 and 943 MWe.

2007 leak
An INES level 2 incident occurred in November 2007 at the Unit 1 reactor. The Spanish Nuclear Safety Council (CSN) was not advised of the leak until April 4. Although the leak happened in November, particles were not detected outdoors until March 2008.

CSN initially estimated that total radioactivity detected was about 235,000 becquerels. The council operating the plant later estimated that a maximum of 2.3 microcuries of radioactivity were spilled. CSN announced it was changing the classification of the leak from Level 1 to Level 2 because of "inadequate control of radioactive material and of providing incomplete and deficient information to the controlling body." An investigation was opened and the director of the plant was fired.

See also

Nuclear power in Spain

References

External links

 Consejo de Seguridad Nuclear profile
 Nuclear Power Plants - Spain at the Nuclear Tourist website.

Nuclear power stations in Catalonia
Nuclear power stations using pressurized water reactors